The Lambda 10 Project is a national clearinghouse of information pertaining to LGBT issues in American fraternities and sororities. The organization works to heighten the visibility of out members (chiefly university students), and offers educational resources related to sexual orientation and the fraternity/sorority experience.

The Lambda 10 Project was founded in the autumn of 1995 at Indiana University in Bloomington, Indiana; it is currently headquartered in the University's Office of Student Ethics and Anti-harassment Programs.

Among the organization's offerings are an index of lecturers available for events; lists of forums concerning LGBT "Greek life"; and a repository of magazine articles, websites, and pertinent news stories. Working with the renowned LGBT publisher Alyson Publications, Lambda 10 also compiled and released three anthologies of homosexual and bisexual students' Greek experiences: Out on Fraternity Row: Personal Accounts of Being Gay in a College Fraternity (1998), Secret Sisters: Stories of Being Lesbian and Bisexual in a College Sorority (2001) and Brotherhood: Gay Life in College Fraternities (2005).

Lambda 10 Project is an educational initiative of Campus Pride, an American national nonprofit 501(c)(3) organization which serves lesbian, gay, bisexual and transgender (LGBT) and ally student leaders and/or campus organization.  It is an associate member of the Association of Fraternity Advisors and serves as a resource for the leaders of numerous national and international fraternities and sororities.

The Project created an educational resource titled Out on Fraternity Row: Personal Accounts of Being Gay in a College Fraternity released by Alyson Publications, Inc in 1998, Secret Sisters: Stories of Being Lesbian & Bisexual in a College Sorority released by Alyson Publications, Inc. in 2001 and recently Brotherhood: Gay Life in College Fraternities released by Alyson Publications, Inc. in October 2005.

See also
 Gay–straight alliance

References

Bibliography
Howard, Kim and Annie Stevens (eds.). Out & About Campus: Personal Accounts by Lesbian, Gay, Bisexual & Transgender College Students. Alyson Publications, 2000. 
Windmeyer, Shane L. and Pamela W. Freeman (eds.). Out on Fraternity Row: Personal Accounts of Being Gay in a College Fraternity. Alyson Publications, 1998. 
Windmeyer, Shane L. and Pamela W. Freeman (eds.). Secret Sisters: Stories of Being Lesbian and Bisexual in a College Sorority. Alyson Publications, 2001.

External links
The Lambda 10 Project

LGBT youth organizations based in the United States
Student organizations established in 1995
History of youth
Civil rights organizations in the United States
LGBT and education
1995 establishments in Indiana